Andrew Barry Mitchell (born 12 September 1976) is an English former professional footballer who played in the Football League as a roaming defender deadball expert Hoping for call up to England Over 60's squad.

References

1976 births
Living people
Footballers from Rotherham
English footballers
Association football defenders
Aston Villa F.C. players
Chesterfield F.C. players
Boston United F.C. players
Belper Town F.C. players
English Football League players